Muhammad Adamu Aliero (born 1 January 1957) was governor of Kebbi State in Nigeria from 29 May 1999 to 29 May 2007. He is a member of the People's Democratic Party (PDP).
He became Senator for Kebbi Central from June 5, 2007 till December 18, 2008.

Aliero was appointed Minister of the Federal Capital Territory by President Umaru Musa Yar'Adua in December 2008.
He left office in March 2010 when Acting President Goodluck Jonathan dissolved his cabinet.

Personal life 

He has three wives Maimuna, Zainab and Aaliyah. He is the father of 11 children 10 boys 1 girl. Their names are Fatima, Sadiq, Mustapha, Abdulazziz Aliyu, Umar, Ayman, Adamu, Khalil, Abubakar, and Ahmed. He is currently living in Abuja.

Early life 

Born in Aliero, Aliero Local Government Area of Kebbi State (then part of the Northern Region), Adamu received his primary education at an Islamic school. His elementary education commenced in 1965 at Aliero Town Planning School. He then attended the Government Secondary School in Koko and graduated in 1976.

This was followed by admission into the School of Basic Studies at Ahmadu Bello University, where he enrolled in the Interim Joint Matriculation Board (IJMB) certificate program. He began undergraduate studies in 1977 and graduated with a Bachelor of Science degree in political science in 1980.

Early career 

In 1981, Aliero began his working career as an administrative officer at the College of Education in Sokoto and joined the Nigeria Immigration Service in the same year. In 1997, he voluntarily resigned from the Customs and Excise Service and went into the private business sector, dealing in export and import trade.

Political career 

His political career began in 1998 when, running on the platform of the now defunct United Nigeria Congress Party (UNCP), he contested and won a Senate seat representing the Kebbi Central constituency. The results of the election annulled soon after they were announced. Following the death of military dictator Sani Abacha and a brief period of transition, new elections were held. Aliero, now representing the All People's Party (APP), contested and won the Kebbi State gubernatorial election. He was sworn in on 29 May 1999.

Aliero was re-elected in 2003 for a second four-year term and was one of only four incumbent ANPP (the APP was later renamed All Nigeria People's Party due to a factional split) governors to maintain their positions.

Aliero left the ANPP and joined the Peoples Democratic Party (PDP) in February 2007. He contested the April 2007 general elections for the Senate and won under the banner of the PDP. He is currently the member representing Kebbi Central Senatorial District in the Senate of the Federal Republic of Nigeria.

He has been switching from one party to the other. For example, he re-decamped to PDP after spending about a year in CPC in early 2012. He later moved from PDP to APC in 2014. He and his some of his close associates since 1999, like Sani Zauro, who was also former state chairman of defunct Congress for Progressive Change (CPC) board of trustees (BoT) in Kebbi State also quit PDP for APC.

See also
List of Governors of Kebbi State

References

Living people
1959 births
Governors of Kebbi State
Ministers of the Federal Capital Territory (Nigeria)
United Nigeria Congress Party politicians
All People's Party (Nigeria) politicians
All Nigeria Peoples Party politicians
Peoples Democratic Party members of the Senate (Nigeria)
Federal ministers of Nigeria
21st-century Nigerian politicians
Ahmadu Bello University alumni